Shahzad Sheikh (Punjabi) is a Pakistani television and film actor. He is the son of Pakistani actor, director and producer Jawed Sheikh. He made his acting debut with the television series Dreamers (2011), and has since gained success with starring roles in several successful television series, including the comedy Annie Ki Ayegi Baraat (2012), the teen romance Choti Si Zindagi (2016), the romantic drama Mohabbat Tumse Nafrat Hai (2017), the spiritual drama Alif Allah Aur Insaan (2017), the religious drama Qurban (2017), and the romances Tabeer (2018), Anaa (2019). In 2020, his performance in the serial Raaz-e-Ulfat was highly praised. In 2021 for the first time, Sheikh played a negative role of Sahil in HUM TV's Phaans.

Sheikh is also known for playing a troubled Punjabi lover in the comedy telefilm Main Kukkoo Aur woh (2013), a cricketer in the sports drama film Main Hoon Shahid Afridi (2013), and an introvert in the romantic comedy film Karachi Se Lahore (2015), both of which were commercially successful at the box office. In 2021, Sheikh appeared opposite Kinza Hashmi in the comedy telefilm "Pyar Mein Blind ". The film was released on Eid-ul-Adha.

Early life 
Sheikh was born to actor Javed Sheikh and his wife, Zeenat Mangi, a housewife. He has a sister, actress Momal Sheikh. He is the nephew of Saleem Sheikh and Behroze Sabzwari and the cousin of Shehroz Sabzwari, all actors. He has spent his early life in Larkana, where he attended primary and secondary school. He later went to the New York Film Academy, in the United States, to attain his degree in method acting and filmmaking.

Career 
Sheikh started his acting career from television shows like AAG TV's 2011's Dreamers in which he played the lead role of Mickey along with Ainy Jaffri. In 2012, Sheikh played a lead role of Mikaal Ahmad in Geo TV's series Kis Ki Ayegi Baraat's fourth season Annie Ki Ayegi Baraat along with Naveen Waqar as Annie, and the other cast included Alishba Yousuf, Bushra Ansari, Javed Sheikh, Samina Ahmed, and Hina Dilpazeer. Marina Khan directed the season and was written by Vasay Chaudhry. Sheikh also played another lead in 2012 as Zeeshan in the Geo's serial Mi Raqsam along with Ayeza Khan, Waseem Abbas, and Salman Shahid which Sabiha Sumar directed and written by Kifayat Rodani.

In 2013, Sheikh played a supporting role in Hum TV's Halki Si Khalish along with Javed Sheikh, Mehreen Raheel, and Mawra Hocane. He also played another supporting role in 2013 in the ARY Digital's serial Mere Hamrahi as Aahad, along with Fahad Mustafa and Soniya Hussain in the lead. Furqan Khan directed while Sana Fahad wrote the serial. Sheikh made his film debut the same year, by playing a supporting role of a cricketer Mikaal Qureshi in the sports drama Main Hoon Shahid Afridi opposite Humayun Saeed, Noman Habib, Javed Sheikh, Mahnoor Baloch and Nadeem Baig. The film was directed by Syed Ali Raza Usama and scripted by Vasay Chaudhry, released domestically on August 23, 2013, by ARY Films.

In 2014, he starred in a supporting role in ARY's serial Bhabhi along with Aijaz Aslam and Sohai Ali Abro, which Asif Younus directed and Ghazala Aziz wrote. He played a supporting role in the ARY's Soteli along with Ayesha Khan, Deepak Perwani, and Sabreen Hisbani, directed by Shehrazade Sheikh and written by Seema Ghazal.

Sheikh came on board as the lead in the road comedy film Karachi Se Lahore (2015), directed by Wajahat Rauf and written by Yasir Hussain. Ayesha Omer and Javed Sheikh also starred in the film, which released domestically on July 31, 2015. Sheikh then won the accolades for playing the polite and naive Gulraiz in Mohabbat Tumse Nafrat Hai alongside Ayeza Khan and Imran Abbas Naqvi. Sheikh also played the parallel lead of Shahmir in ARY's Qurban along with Iqra Aziz and Bilal Abbas Khan. In 2018, Sheikh played the lead role of Fawad Azam in the HUM TV's hit drama Tabeer along with Iqra Aziz. This marked his third collaboration with Iqra Aziz. In 2019, he played the lead role of Areesh in Hum TV's Anaa along with Hania Amir ,and played the character of Salar in the series Deewar-e-Shab, alongside Sarah Khan, Shehroz Sabzwari, Bushra Ansari. In 2020, he starred as Irtiza in Geo Entertainment series Raaz-e-Ulfat, opposite Yumna Zaidi and Komal Aziz Khan. The series was reviewed positively, and he was praised for his performance. He concluded the year with the Hum TV series Tum Ho Wajah, along with an ensemble cast of Sawera Nadeem, Shahood Alvi, Saboor Aly and Sumbul Iqbal. The series was not well received by the public. The following year, he starred as Sahil in Hum TV's Phaans Alongside with Sami Khan,	Zara Noor Abbas, Yashma Gill.Sheikh, has played a negative role for the first time in his career, The series follows the struggle of a sexual assault survivor.
Currently , he is playing the lead role in the drama series mere humnasheen opposite to  Hiba bukhari.

Personal life 
Sheikh married lawyer Hina Mir on 28 December 2012 in Karachi. According to the actor, they met at a mutual friend's wedding and fell in love at first sight. The couple have two children.

Filmography

Films

Television

Telefilms

Awards and nominations

References

External links 
 

Living people
1982 births
Male actors from Karachi
New York Academy of Art alumni
Pakistani male film actors
Pakistani male television actors
Pakistani male models
Punjabi people
21st-century Pakistani male actors